Raj Rishi Bhartrihari Matsya University (RRBMU), formerly Matsya University, is a state university located at Alwar, Rajasthan, India. It was established in 2012 by the Government of Rajasthan through the Matsya University, Alwar Act, 2012 and was later renamed though the Matsya University, Alwar (Change of Name) Act, 2014. It has jurisdiction over all colleges in the Alwar district.

References

External links

Universities in Rajasthan
Educational institutions established in 2012
2012 establishments in Rajasthan
Universities and colleges in Alwar